P S Subramanyam (Prakya Sreesaila Subrahmanyam) (born in 1950, in Vijayawada, Andhra Pradesh) is an Indian aerospace scientist who served as the Director of Aeronautical Development Agency.

Awards and honours

 DRDO Performance Excellence Award for the year 2013 from The Prime Minister India Mr. Narendra Modi
 Annual Inspired Indian Foundation Award 2014 for Proactive Leadership In Aerospace from His Excellency Governor of Karnataka.

References

http://www.drdo.gov.in/drdo/English/dpi/press_release/PSSubramanyam%20.pdf

Scientists from Vijayawada
1950 births
Living people
Indian Institute of Science alumni
Engineers from Andhra Pradesh
Indian mechanical engineers
20th-century Indian engineers